The Slavery Memorial is a sculptural memorial on the campus of Brown University that recognizes the institution's 18th century connections to chattel slavery and the transatlantic slave trade. Designed by sculptor Martin Puryear and dedicated in 2014, the memorial stands on the university's Front Green, adjacent to University Hall.

Description 
Constructed of ductile cast iron, the Slavery Memorial depicts a cast-iron ball and chain partially buried underground; the third link of the chain is broken in two.

A granite plaque in front of the memorial reads:

History 

In 2003, then-university president Ruth Simmons launched a steering committee to research Brown's 18th century ties to slavery. In October 2006, the committee released a report documenting its findings. The university established a commission in July of the following year to consider how best to fulfill the report's recommendation of creating a "living site of memory." The commission studied a number of existing memorials including the Civil Rights Memorial, African Burial Ground National Monument, and Memorial to the Abolition of Slavery. In 2012, the university's governing body voted unanimously to award Martin Puryear the commission to design a sculptural memorial on Brown's campus.

The university originally considered placing the memorial in the Jewelry District, adjacent to Brown's then-planned medical campus. A university committee ultimately chose to locate the memorial on the Front Green of Brown's main campus given its highly visible location and proximity to University Hall, which was constructed in part by enslaved laborers.

The memorial was installed in the summer of 2014 and dedicated by president Christina Paxson on September 27 of the same year.

References

See also 

 List of Brown University statues
 Memorial to Enslaved Laborers
 Slavery at American colleges and universities

Monuments and memorials to victims of slavery in the United States
Brown University
African-American history of Rhode Island
Sculptures in Rhode Island